Great Big Hits is the 11th album by popular children's entertainers Sharon, Lois & Bram, originally released in 1992. The album features 31 favorite Sharon, Lois & Bram songs, most released on previous albums, although the trio did re-recorded several songs especially for this album to give them more of a "Sharon, Lois & Bram sound".

Releases
The original release was in 1992 under Elephant Records in Canada, and under A&M Records in the United States. Then in 2004, Great Big Hits was re-released under Casablanca Kids Inc. The album is also available in a 2-Disc BoxSet released by Casablanca Kids in 2004.

1992 (Elephant Records/A&M Records)Cassette/CD 
2004/2005/2008 (Casablanca Kids Inc.) CD

Touring and promotions
To promote the album, Sharon, Lois & Bram launched their "Great Big Tour" across Canada and the United States, presented by Nickelodeon US and Eaton's Canada. Pictures from the tour can be seen in the Sharon, Lois & Bram Photo Album that was published to sell at Great Big Hits concerts. The Great Big Tour sold over 200,000 seats across North America.

They also released a mini-compilation album to promote Great Big Hits. It was titled Kidbits and featured a selection of songs from their earlier albums as well as a special Skinnamarink Introduction where the trio personally welcomes you to the album and gives a brief description of their career and what to expect in terms of the Great Big Hits album. It is available only on cassette.

Great Big Hits proved that Sharon, Lois & Bram were rising stars and were an upward trend in popularity at the time because the album only took 2 months to "go gold", whereas their previous album, Sing A to Z, released in 1990, took 2 years to "go gold".

In addition, a Songbook titled "Great Big Hits" was published by Warner-Chappell Music in 1993. It contains piano music, guitar chords, and lyrics to all of the songs found on the album, as well as a special 4-Hand Skinnamarink Duet for the piano.

Nominations and awards

Our Choice Award, Canadian Children's Book Centre (1992)
iParenting Media Awards, Hottest Product for 2004 (2004)
Parents Choice, Recommended (2004)
Gold

Track listing
"One Elephant"*
"She'll Be Coming Round the Mountain"*
"Peanut Butter & Jelly"*
"Jenny Jenkins"*
"Chugga-Chugga"*
"Savez-Vous Planter Les Choux?"
"If I Could Have A Windmill"
"A You're Adorable"*
"Pop! Goes the Weasel"
"Grandpa's Farm"
"Susannah's A Funny Old Man"
"Five Brown Buns"
"We're All Together Again / If I Knew You Were Coming I'd've Baked A Cake"
"Newfoundland Jig Medley"
"Little Rabbit Foo-Foo"
"Five Little Monkeys"
"Tingalayo"*
"Hey Dum Diddeley Dum"*
"How Much Is That Doggie in the Window?"
"Rags"*
"Fish & Chips & Vinegar"
"The Smile on the Crocodile"
"Ballin' the Jack"
"Candy Man, Salty Dog"
"Pufferbellies"
"The Eensy Weensy Spider"
"Mommy, What If..."
"Shoe A Little Horse"
"Caballito Blanco"
"Little Sir Echo"
"Precious Friends / Skinnamarink"

Tracks 1, 2, 17 from One Elephant, Deux Elephants
[*] Re-recordings

Trivia
The child saying "G. That makes me think of Grandma and Grandpa." is cut out.

References

Sharon, Lois & Bram albums
1992 greatest hits albums